Lieutenant General Mohammed Khaled Al-Khadher, الفريق ركن محمد خالد الخضر (born 4 October 1955) He is the former chief of general staff of Kuwait Armed forces. He is a commando officer in Kuwait Army who progressed in the chain of command since 1977, when he got commissioned from Kuwait military college, currently Ali Al-Sabah Military College, until reaching the highest post in the Army as a chief of general staff.

Early life 
Lt Gen Al-Khadher comes from a military family where his three younger brothers followed his footsteps. He was born in Alshamiyah and lived his childhood in Jiblah and Al-Murqab before moving to Alfaiha in 1960 where he still lives with his family.

Personal life 
He is married and has 5 children (Aishah, Faisal, Abdullah, Abdulwahab and Abdulrahman). Lt Gen Al-Khadher is the elder brother of the famous melodist,  who died in January 1998.

Military career 

He got commissioned in 1977 from the Military College in Kuwait and was part of commissioning course 8th's intake. His leadership skills has been prospered since his graduation and this is due to his commitment and love for his country. In August 1990 when Iraq invaded Kuwait, he was a prisoner of war after his resistance's attempts to fight the invaders when he was at the commandos brigade near Al-Jahra. He was in Iraqi's jail for over 7 months along with many armed forces and police officers. After Kuwait's liberation in February 1991, he was freed in March and went back to his unit (Commandos). since then, he took many command posts starting from his own unit and ending with the highest command post in Kuwait Army, Chief of Staff.
Lt. General Al-Khadher was granted 2-year extension in his current position as a chief of staff of the Army, commencing from October 2015. This was as a result of his commitment the great work he has been producing which serves nothing but the best for the Military personnel. The proposal of two-year-extension from the Minister of Defense, retired Lt. General Sheikh Khaled Al-Jarah Al-Sabah, was welcomed by both their highness the Emir Sheikh Sabah Al-Ahmad Al-Jaber Al-Sabah and the crown prince Sheikh Nawaf Al-Ahmad Al-Jaber Al-Sabah. He survived a helicopter crash landing in Bangladesh on 2 January 2018 and was received by Bangladesh's prime minister Sheikh Hasina and by the Emir of Kuwait Sheikh Sabah Al-Ahmad Al-Sabah 
The Council of Ministers approved to renew the mandate of the Chief of General Staff Al-Khadher for three more years in May 2017, which took effect from the day he reached the legal retirement's age.

Honours 

He received the commander of legion honour medal from the French minister during his visit in August 2016 as an appreciation for his outstanding support to the military ties between the two countries. He was honoured by the Sudanese president, Field Marshal Omer Al-Bashir with the medal of Nile in February 2017. He received Bangladesh Army Friendship medal from Chief of Army Staff of Bangladesh General Abu Belal Muhammad Shafiul Huq in January 2018.

References

Living people
1955 births
Military of Kuwait